Federal Route 76 is a federal highway in Kedah and Perak state, Malaysia. The 163.7-km federal highway serves as the main route from Perak and Kedah to the East–West Highway FT4, as well as the main route to Thailand via Keroh and Betong.

Route background
The Kilometre Zero of the Federal Route 76 starts at Kuala Kangsar (West) interchange, Perak, at its interchange with the Malaysia Federal Route 1, the main trunk road of the central of Peninsular Malaysia.

History 
The Federal Route 76 is an important route in Perak, as it leads to the East–West Highway FT4 from Gerik to Jeli. In addition, this federal highway also serves as the gateway to Thailand via Keroh and Betong and vice versa. However, the original alignment of the highway was notorious for its many dangerous sharp corners. To address the safety issue, the federal government upgraded the Kuala Kangsar–Gerik section of the highway, bypassing the sharp corners along the Sauk–Lenggong section. The first section from Gerik to Lenggong was completed in 1995, followed by the second section from Kuala Kangsar to Sauk which was completed in 2002. The final section from Sauk to Lenggong was upgraded as a bypass route to avoid the dangerous sharp corners along the former section of the FT76 highway. The project was started in October 2001 and was completed in November 2005 with the total cost of RM600 million.

As a result of the road upgrade, the former Sauk–Lenggong section was later downgraded into Perak State Route A76 in 2014.

Notable events
 1941–1942 – The Federal Route 76 became a main route for Japanese Imperial forces from Pattani to Ipoh during Battle of Malaya.
 1955 – The Baling agreement between Communist Party of Malaya and Federation of Malaya Government.
 July 2000 – The Sauk armed heist took places.
 12 April 2001 – Twelve women and a boy were killed when a bus skidded and crashed into a ditch off the Pengkalan Hulu–Baling road near Baling, Kedah.

Features
 There are four Rest and Service Areas: Gunung Inas, Gerik, Lawin and Selat Pagar.
 Lenggong archeological town
 Chenderoh Lake

List of junctions

{|class="wikitable plainrowheaders"
|-
!scope="col"|State
!scope="col"|District
!scope="col"|km
!scope="col"|Exit
!scope="col"|Name
!scope="col"|Destinations
!scope="col"|Notes
|-
|rowspan="4"|Kedah
|rowspan="4"|Baling
!scope="row" align=right|
|
|Baling I/S
| Jalan Kuala Ketil – Kulim, Sungai Petani, Kuala Ketil Jalan Baling-Sik – Weng, Sik
|
|-
!scope="row" align=right|
|
|Batu 7 Rambong I/S
| Jalan Batu 49 Bongor-Rambong – Batu 7 Rambong, Banggol Pompang, Rambong
|
|-
!scope="row" align=right|
|
|Ulu Legong Hot Springs
|
|
|-
!scope="row" align=right|
|colspan=4 align=center|Gunung Inas RSA (eastbound)
|-
|rowspan="46"|Perak
|rowspan="34"|Hulu Perak
!scope="row" align=right|
|
|MRSM Pengkalan Hulu
|
|
|-
!scope="row" align=right|
|
|Pengkalan Hulu I/S
| Jalan Keroh – Keroh, Betong Jalan Tasek – Kampung Baru Tasek
|
|-
!scope="row" align=right|
|
|Kelian Intan
|
|
|-
!scope="row" align=right|
|
|Kampung Lalang I/S
| Malaysia Federal Route 1157 – Ayer Panas, Keroh
|
|-
!scope="row" align=right|
|
|Kampung Batu Hampar
|
|
|-
!scope="row" align=right|
|
|Kampung Plang
|
|
|-
!scope="row" align=right|
|
|Kampung Jong
|
|
|-
!scope="row" align=right|
|
|Kampung Kerunai
|
|
|-
!scope="row" align=right|
|
|Kampung Pahat
|
|
|-
!scope="row" align=right|
|
|East-West Highway I/S
|  East–West Highway – Kupang, Baling, Kulim, Butterworth, Jeli, Tanah Merah, Kota Bharu, Banding Island, Lake Temenggor
|
|-
!scope="row" align=right|
|colspan=4 align=center| Gerik RSA (northbound)
|-
!scope="row" align=right|
|
|Kampung Bahru Batu Dua roundabout(East–West Highway roundabout)
|  East–West Highway (old road) – Jeli, Tanah Merah, Kota Bharu, Banding Island, Lake Temenggor
|
|-
!scope="row" align=right|
|
|Gerik town centreJalan Kuala Kenderong I/S
| Jalan Kuala Kenderong – Kg. Baharu Kuala Rui, Bersia Dam and Hydroelectric Station, Temenggor Dam and Hydroelectric Station
|
|-
!scope="row" align=right|
|
|Gerik town centreJalan Tanjung Kala I/S
| Perak State Route A169 – Kampung Tanjung Kala
|
|-
!scope="row" align=right|
|colspan=4 align=center|Sungai Rui bridge
|-
!scope="row" align=right|
|
|Kampung Padang
|
|
|-
!scope="row" align=right|
|
|Kampung Tawai
|
|
|-
!scope="row" align=right|
|
|Kampung Kenayat Besar
|
|
|-
!scope="row" align=right|
|
|Lawin
|
|
|-
!scope="row" align=right|
|colspan=4 align=center|Lawin RSA (northbound)
|-
!scope="row" align=right|
|
|Kampung Belum Baharu
|
|
|-
!scope="row" align=right|
|colspan=4 align=center|Selat Pagar RSA (northbound)
|-
!scope="row" align=right|
|
|Kampung Sumpitan I/S
| Jalan Kubu Gajah–Lenggong – Kubu Gajah, Taiping, Selama, Bagan Serai
|
|-
!scope="row" align=right|
|
|Lenggong I/S
| Jalan Lama Sauk–Lenggong – Lenggong town centre
|
|-
!scope="row" align=right|
|
|Kota Tampan I/S
| Jalan Lama Sauk–Lenggong – Lenggong town centre
|
|-
!scope="row" align=right|
|
|Lata Kekabu Waterfall
|Lata Kekabu Waterfall
|
|-
!scope="row" align=right|
|
|MRSM Lenggong I/S
| Jalan Lama Sauk–Lenggong – Lenggong town centre, Maktab Rendah Sains MARA (MRSM) Lenggong, Kampung Changkat Berangan, Tasik Raban, Kampung Kuak, Kampung Jenalik
|
|-
!scope="row" align=right|
|colspan="4" align=center|Tasik Raban bridgeRaja Muda Nazrin Bridge
|-
!scope="row" align=right|
|colspan="4" align=center|Tasik Raban RSA (southbound, abandoned)
|-
!scope="row" align=right|
|
|Kampung Kelantan
|
|
|-
!scope="row" align=right|
|
|Kampung Jenalik I/S
| Jalan Lama Sauk–Lenggong – Kampung Changkat Berangan, Tasik Raban, Kampung Kuak, Kampung Jenalik
|
|-
!scope="row" align=right|
|
|Kampung Jenalik Hilir
|
|
|-
!scope="row" align=right|
|
|Kampung Ngor I/S
| Jalan Lama Sauk–Lenggong – Kampung Changkat Berangan, Tasik Raban, Kampung Kuak, Kampung Jenalik
|
|-
!scope="row" align=right|
|
|Kampung Changkat Duku
|
|
|-
|rowspan="12"|Kuala Kangsar
!scope="row" align=right|
|
|Sauk I/S
| Perak State Route A152 – Chegar Galah, Bendang Selinsing, Chenderoh Lake
|
|-
!scope="row" align=right|
|
|Kampung Chuar Hulu
|
|
|-
!scope="row" align=right|
|
|Kampung Chuar
|
|
|-
!scope="row" align=right|
|
|Kati I/S
| Jalan Sungai Temong – Sungai Temong, Sungai Siput, Kuala Kangsar
|
|-
!scope="row" align=right|
|
|Kampung Changkat Jambu
|
|
|-
!scope="row" align=right|
|
|Kampung Liman Kati
|
|
|-
!scope="row" align=right|
|
|Sungai Chempias I/S
| Jalan Paya Lintah – Paya Lintah, Padang Rengas
|
|-
!scope="row" align=right|
|
|Kampung Lubuk Merbau I/S
| Jalan Sungai Akar – Kampung Sungai Akar, Kampung Tanah Merah, Kampung Beluru
|
|-
!scope="row" align=right|
|
|Miel Industrial Area I/S
|Miel Industrial Area, Chenderoh Community College
|
|-
!scope="row" align=right|
|
|Kuala Kangsar (West) I/C
| Jalan Taiping – Padang Rengas, Changkat Jering, Taiping, Kuala Kangsar, Sungai Siput
|
|-
!scope="row" align=right|
|colspan=4 align=center|Kuala Kangsar Toll Plaza   MyRFID
|-
!scope="row" align=right|
|143
|Kuala Kangsar I/C
|  North–South Expressway Northern Route – Bukit Kayu Hitam, Penang, Kuala Lumpur, Ipoh
|

References

076